My Blue Heaven is an album by jazz guitarist John Pizzarelli that was released in 1990.

Track listing
 "My Blue Heaven" (Walter Donaldson, George A. Whiting) - (4:02)
 "I'm an Errand Boy for Rhythm" (Nat King Cole) - (3:49)
 "It Could Happen to You" (Johnny Burke, James Van Heusen) - (3:25)
 "Oh, Lady Be Good!" (George Gershwin, Ira Gershwin) - (8:05)
 "Touch of Your Lips" (Ray Noble) - (2:35)
 "Can't Take You Nowhere" (Al Cohn, Dave Frishberg, Tiny Kahn) - (4:08)
 "Take My Smile" (John Pizzarelli) - (2:55)
 "That's What" (Nat King Cole) - (3:04)
 "Stray Horn" (Bucky Pizzarelli) - (2:49)
 "Best Man" (Ron Alfred, Fred Wise) - (2:48)
 "Oh Me, Oh My, Oh Gosh" (Slam Stewart) - (3:27)
 "Don't Get Around Much Anymore" (Duke Ellington, Bob Russell) - (3:13)
 "Gee, Baby, Ain't I Good to You" (Andy Razaf, Don Redman) - (3:19)
 "Passion Flower" (Milt Raskin, Billy Strayhorn) - (4:15)
 "Zoot Walked In/Morning Fun" (Al Cohn, Dave Frishberg, Gerry Mulligan, Jack Sims, John Sims) - (4:29)
 "Candy" (Mack David, Alex Kramer, Joan Whitney) - (3:38)

Personnel
 John Pizzarelli – guitar, vocals
 Bucky Pizzarelli – guitar
 Clark Terry – trumpet
 Dave McKenna – piano
 Milt Hinton – double bass
 Connie Kay – drums

References

1990 albums
John Pizzarelli albums
Chesky Records albums